William Fitch Allen (July 28, 1808 – June 3, 1878) was an American lawyer and politician.

Life
He was born on July 28, 1808, in Windham County, Connecticut, the eldest son of Abner Harvey Allen and Cynthia Palmer, a sister of the mother of Sanford E. Church. He graduated from Union College in 1826. He was admitted to the bar in 1829, and commenced practice in partnership with George Fisher at Oswego until 1833. In 1834, he formed a partnership with Abraham P. Grant which continued until his election to the New York Supreme Court. He was Supervisor of the Town of Oswego in 1836 and 1837.

Allen was a Democratic member of the New York State Assembly in 1843 and 1844. From 1845 to 1847, he was United States Attorney for the Northern District of New York. He was a justice of the New York Supreme Court from 1847 to 1863, and sat ex officio on the Court of Appeals in 1854 and 1862. In 1863, he removed to New York City and resumed the practice of law there.

He was New York State Comptroller from 1868 to 1870, elected at the New York state election, 1867; and re-elected at the New York state election, 1869. He resigned this office in June 1870.

At the New York special judicial election, 1870, he was elected to the New York Court of Appeals, and in July 1870 became one of the first judges of the new court upon its re-organization after the amendment of the State Constitution in 1869. He remained on the bench until his death on June 3, 1878, in Oswego, New York.

Sources

External links
 Court of Appeals history
 Bio at NYCoA history

1808 births
1878 deaths
New York State Comptrollers
Members of the New York State Assembly
Politicians from Oswego, New York
New York Supreme Court Justices
Judges of the New York Court of Appeals
People from Windham County, Connecticut
Union College (New York) alumni
United States Attorneys for the Northern District of New York
Town supervisors in New York (state)
19th-century American politicians
19th-century American judges